The 2016 All-Big Ten Conference football team consists of American football players chosen as All-Big Ten Conference players for the 2016 Big Ten Conference football season.  The conference recognizes two official All-Big Ten selectors: (1) the Big Ten conference coaches selected separate offensive and defensive units and named first-, second- and third-team players (the "Coaches" team); and (2) a panel of sports writers and broadcasters covering the Big Ten also selected offensive and defensive units and named first-, second- and third-team players (the "Media" team).

Offensive selections

Quarterbacks
 J. T. Barrett, Ohio State (Coaches-1; Media-1)
 Trace McSorley, Penn State (Coaches-2; Media-2)
 Wilton Speight, Michigan (Coaches-3; Media-3)

Running backs
 Saquon Barkley, Penn State (Coaches-1; Media-1)
 Corey Clement, Wisconsin (Coaches-1; Media-2)
 Justin Jackson, Northwestern (Coaches-2; Media-1)
 Mike Weber, Ohio State (Coaches-2; Media-2)
 Akrum Wadley, Iowa (Coaches-3)
 Rodney Smith, Minnesota (Coaches-3; Media-3)
 L. J. Scott, Michigan State (Media-3)

Wide receivers
 Austin Carr, Northwestern (Coaches-1; Media-1)
 Curtis Samuel, Ohio State (Coaches-1; Media-1)
 Amara Darboh, Michigan (Coaches-2; Media-2)
 R. J. Shelton, Michigan State (Coaches-2)
 DeAngelo Yancey, Purdue (Coaches-3; Media-2)
 Jordan Westerkamp, Nebraska (Coaches-3; Media-3)
 Drew Wolitarsky, Minnesota (Media-3)
 Chris Godwin, Penn State (Media-3)

Centers
 Pat Elflein, Ohio State (Coaches-1, Media-1)
 Mason Cole, Michigan (Coaches-2, Media-2)
 Sean Welsh, Iowa (Coaches-3; Media-3)

Guards
 Dan Feeney, Indiana (Coaches-1; Media-1)
 Billy Price, Ohio State (Coaches-1; Media-1)
 Kyle Kalis, Michigan (Coaches-2; Media-2)
 Beau Benzschawel, Wisconsin (Coaches-2; Media-3)
 Brian Allen, Michigan State (Coaches-3; Media-2)
 James Daniels, Iowa (Coaches-3; Media-3)

Tackles
 Erik Magnuson, Michigan (Coaches-1; Media-1)
 Ryan Ramczyk, Wisconsin (Coaches-1; Media-1)
 Ben Braden, Michigan (Coaches-2; Media-2)
 Jamarco Jones, Ohio State (Coaches-2; Media-2)
 Cole Croston, Iowa (Coaches-3)
 Jonah Pirsig, Minnesota (Coaches-3; Media-3)
 Nick Gates, Nebraska (Media-3)

Tight ends
 Jake Butt, Michigan (Coaches-1; Media-1)
 Troy Fumagalli, Wisconsin (Coaches-2; Media-3)
 Mike Gesicki, Penn State (Coaches-2)
 Josiah Price, Michigan State (Media-3)

Defensive selections

Defensive linemen
 Taco Charlton, Michigan (Coaches-1; Media-1)
 Tyquan Lewis, Ohio State (Coaches-1; Media-1)
 Jaleel Johnson, Iowa (Coaches-1; Media-2)	
 Chris Wormley, Michigan (Coaches-1; Media-2)
 Carroll Phillips, Illinois (Media-1)
 Ifeadi Odenigbo, Northwestern (Coaches-2; Media-1)
 Ryan Glasgow, Michigan (Coaches-2; Media-2)
 Malik McDowell, Michigan State (Coaches-2; Media-2)
 Garrett Sickels, Penn State (Coaches-2; Media-3)
 Dawuane Smoot, Illinois (Coaches-3; Media-3)
 Steven Richardson, Minnesota (Coaches-3; Media-3)
 Evan Schwan, Penn State (Coaches-3; Media-3)
 Conor Sheehy, Wisconsin (Media-3)

Linebackers
 Jabrill Peppers, Michigan (Coaches-1; Media-1)
 T. J. Watt, Wisconsin (Coaches-1; Media-1)
 Raekwon McMillan, Ohio State (Coaches-1; Media-1)
 Josey Jewell, Iowa (Coaches-2; Media-2)
 Anthony Walker, Jr., Northwestern (Coaches-2; Media-3)
 Vince Biegel, Wisconsin (Coaches-2; Media-3)
 Tegray Scales, Indiana (Coaches-3; Media-2)
 Ben Gedeon, Michigan (Coaches-3; Media-2)
 Riley Bullough, Michigan State (Coaches-3; Media-3)
 Jason Cabinda, Penn State (Coaches-3)

Defensive backs
 Desmond King, Iowa (Coaches-1; Media-1)
 Jourdan Lewis, Michigan (Coaches-1; Media-1)
 Malik Hooker, Ohio State (Coaches-1; Media-1)
 Marshon Lattimore, Ohio State (Coaches-1; Media-2)
 Sojourn Shelton, Wisconsin (Coaches-2; Media-1)
 Lano Hill, Michigan (Coaches-2)
 Channing Stribling, Michigan (Coaches-2; Media-2)
 Godwin Igwebuike, Northwestern (Coaches-2; Media-3)
 Gareon Conley, Ohio State (Coaches-2; Media-3)
 Rashard Fant, Indiana (Coaches-3; Media-2)
 Nathan Gerry, Nebraska (Coaches-3; Media-2)
 Marcus Allen, Penn State (Coaches-3)
 D'Cota Dixon, Wisconsin (Media-3)
 Leo Musso, Wisconsin (Media-3)

Special teams

Kickers
 Tyler Davis, Penn State (Coaches-1; Media-2)
 Emmit Carpenter, Minnesota (Coaches-2; Media-1)
 Tyler Durbin, Ohio State (Coaches-3; Media-3)

Punters
 Cameron Johnston, Ohio State (Coaches-1; Media-1)
 Kenny Allen, Michigan (Coaches-2; Media-2)
 Ron Coluzzi, Iowa (Coaches-3; Media-3)

Return specialist
 Jabrill Peppers, Michigan (Coaches-1; Media-1)
 Desmond King, Iowa (Coaches-2; Media-2)
 Parris Campbell, Ohio State (Coaches-3)
 Solomon Vault, Northwestern (Media-3)

Key

See also
 2016 College Football All-America Team

References

All-Big Ten Conference
All-Big Ten Conference football teams